Koraga (also rendered Koragar, Koragara, Korangi) is a Dravidian language spoken by the Koraga people, a Scheduled tribe people of Dakshina Kannada, Karnataka, and Kerala in South West India. The dialect spoken by the Koraga tribe in Kerala, Mudu Koraga, is divergent enough to not be intelligible with Korra Koraga.

Classification
Koraga is a member of the Dravidian family of languages. It is further classified into the Southern Dravidian family. Koraga is a spoken language and generally not written, whenever it is written it makes use of Kannada script. Koraga people are generally conversant in Tulu and Kannada languages and hence use those languages as a medium for producing literature.

Dialects
Onti (spoken in Udupi)
Tappu (in Hebri)
Mudu (in Kundapura)
Ande (midway between tappu and onti and in Mangalore)

All the speakers who speak Mudu dialect are bilingual with Kannada language and all speaking onti dialect are bilingual with Tulu language. This has resulted a strong influence of Kannada on Mudu koraga and also similar influence of Tulu is seen on onti koraga dialect. Majority of negative forms of onti koraga language are borrowed from Tulu language.

Phonology

Vowels

Consonants

References

Bibliography

External links
"Koraga language: A primer"

Dravidian languages
Languages of Karnataka
Agglutinative languages
Languages of Kerala
Endangered languages of India